Rudolph Ralph John Zunich (November 24, 1910 – March 13, 1974) was a professional ice hockey defenseman who played in the NHL with the Detroit Red Wings for 2 games during the 1943–44 NHL season. He was held pointless, but he did register a minor penalty. Although Rudolph never registered a point in the NHL, he went on to pursue the life of a hockey coach.

Career statistics

Regular season and playoffs

References

External links
 

1910 births
1974 deaths
American men's ice hockey defensemen
Detroit Red Wings players
Ice hockey players from Michigan
People from Calumet, Michigan